"Caroline and I" is a song by the Australian indie rock band The Go-Betweens that was released as the lead single from their eighth studio album Bright Yellow Bright Orange. It was released as a promotional CD single on the Circus Records label in the United Kingdom in February 2003 and by Trifekta Records in Australia on 9 June 2003.

Reception
David Nichols in his book, The Go-Betweens, considers that "'Caroline and I' is a light engaging study of the rather vague parallels between Robert Forster and Princess Caroline of Monaco, with an irresistible melody line rather similar to that of the Buzzcocks' 'Paradise'." The book also contains an interview with Forster, in which he states that he wrote the song in 1997, when he was living in Germany, saying "She meant a lot to me when I was between the ages of about fifteen and nineteen. She was a glamour figure. Obviously, from the lyrics, she was the same age as me. She was someone I felt attracted to..." "...[Caroline] was my age. I was attracted to her, and it was like we were living these two parallel lives. She went to university at the same time as I did. I went to Queensland University, she went to a university in Paris. It seemed that we were moving in the same direction."

The Guardian's Betty Clarke comments "The heavy-hearted nostalgia of 'Caroline and I' is the song Lou Reed could have written if he had fallen for Brian Wilson, not David Bowie."

The Undercover Review believes that the song is "reminiscent of that sound that has buried them into the psyche of every underground lover in this country and abroad. Such simple melodies thrown together with also simple, yet thought-provoking lyrics is often shrugged off as easy to create, but in reality even the most hardened avoider of trends will find this hard to resist."

The Oz Music Project is not so complimentary however stating "the sinewy sunburst of Robert Forster's typically clean-channeled arpeggio riffs winding their way throughout, it is Forster-by-numbers; skewed, jangly pop with that wildly oscillating warble whorling around over the top. Like much of ‘Rachel Worth' it lacks the invention and passion that made the Go-Betweens such a joy in the first place."

Track listing

Release history

Personnel
Go-Betweens
 Robert Forster – vocals, guitars
 Grant McLennan – vocals, guitars, bass
 Adele Pickvance – bass, keyboards, backing vocals
 Glenn Thompson – drums, backing vocals

Production
 Artwork - Cameron Bird 
 Recording, mixing - Tim Whitten ("Caroline and I")
 Engineer - Chris ("Instant Replay,", "Taxi Taxee", "Girly Lying on a Beach")
 Mastering - Don Bartley
 Producer - The Go-Betweens

References

External links
 "Caroline and I" @ AllMusic
 "Caroline and I" @ Discogs
 "Caroline and I" @ MusicBrainz

2003 singles
The Go-Betweens songs
2003 songs
Songs written by Grant McLennan
Songs written by Robert Forster (musician)